Lilit Teryan or Liliet Teryan (31 December 1930 – 7 March 2019) was an Iranian born sculptor of Armenian heritage. She had to cease teaching sculpture when it was prohibited in Tehran. She began to exhibit in 2008 and then to teach again. She has been called the Mother of Iranian sculpture.

Life 
Teryan was born in Tehran in 1930. She was born in the Naderi area of the city. Her parents were from Armenia. Her mother had been trained as an artist in France and her father worked for the Bank of Tehran. Her mother helped to train her daughters artistic skills.

She took formal art training in Paris at the Beaux Art Academy.

She was trained to teach sculpture and was one of the first to teach in Iran. She taught at the Faculty of Decorative Arts at the University of Tehran. After the revolution the teaching of sculpture became illegal and she had to continue the teaching in secrecy.

The first sight of her work in Tehran was at an exhibition at Tehran Silver Publishing in 2008. Some time after this she began to teach sculpture again at Azad University. She has been called the Mother of Iranian sculpture.

She has created a statue of Mesrop Mashtots the founder of the Armenian alphabet and of the Iranian national hero Yeprem Khan. The statue is at St Mary's church in Tehran.

Teryan died in 2019 in her home city after a fall down some stairs.

References 

1930 births
2019 deaths
People from Tehran
Iranian sculptors
Iranian women sculptors
Armenian sculptors
Armenian women sculptors
Iranian people of Armenian descent
20th-century Iranian people
21st-century Iranian people
Ethnic Armenian artists